Saint Pambo (also known as Pemwah and Bemwah - Όσιος Παμβώ in Greek) (died c. 375) is a Coptic Desert Father of the fourth century. Saint Pambo is venerated by the Oriental Orthodox Churches, the Eastern Orthodox Churches and the Roman Catholic Church. Veneration day is 18 July.

Pambo was a disciple of Saint Anthony the Great. He lived in the Nitrian Desert where he founded many monasteries. He was renowned for his wisdom, and was consulted by many, including Saint Athanasius, Saint Melania the Elder, Saint Rufinus, and Ammonas of Egypt. He was also the spiritual father of many saints, including Saint Pishoy and Saint John the Dwarf.

A founder of the Nitrian Desert monastery in Egypt and a famed disciple of St. Anthony. Having served and studied under Anthony in his youth, Pambo later became a pioneer in establishing the eremitical life in the Nitrian Desert and was much respected for his wisdom. According to tradition, he was regularly visited by some of the most powerful and prominent figures of the time, including Sts. Athanasius, Melania the Elder, and Rufinus. St. Melania was with him when he died.

As a youngster, Saint Pambo once asked Saint Anthony "My Father, teach me to live well." To which the great Saint Anthony answered "My son, to live well, one must have a great distrust of oneself, with every effort watch over one's heart and mind, and in all things seek God alone."

He died in 375 of natural causes. A fictional version of him appears in the 6th-century Legend of Hilaria.

References

375 deaths
Saints from Roman Egypt
Egyptian Christian monks
4th-century Christian saints
Year of birth unknown